In enzymology, a 1,6-alpha-L-fucosidase is an enzyme that catalyzes the chemical reaction

Hydrolysis of 1,6-linkages between alpha-L-fucose and N-acetyl-D-glucosamine in glycopeptides such as immunoglobulin G glycopeptide and fucosyl-asialo-agalacto-fetuin

This enzyme belongs to the family of hydrolases, specifically those glycosidases that hydrolyse O- and S-glycosyl compounds.  The systematic name of this enzyme class is 1,6-L-fucosyl-N-acetyl-D-glucosaminylglycopeptide fucohydrolase. This enzyme is also called alpha-L-fucosidase.

References

 

EC 3.2.1
Enzymes of unknown structure